Inerter  may refer to:
 Inerting system, a device to increase the safety of a closed tank that contains highly flammable material
 Inerter, an element of mechanical network theory, known as a  J-damper when implemented as a real device in the suspensions of Formula 1 racing cars